Markel Etxeberria Mendiola (born 15 February 1995) is a Spanish professional footballer who plays as a right back for Sestao River Club.

Career
Born in Erandio, Basque Country, Etxeberria began his career in the youth ranks of local Athletic Bilbao. He was registered at their third team CD Basconia and had not yet featured for the reserves when he was called up to their squad for their UEFA Europa League play-off second leg against HJK Helsinki, remaining an unused substitute in a 3–3 draw in the Finnish capital.

He played 35 games in the 2014–15 season, as the team ascended from Segunda División B. After missing the start of the next campaign through injury, on 24 October 2015, Etxeberria made his first appearance in a professional league, starting in a goalless draw at San Mamés against fellow promoted team SD Huesca in Segunda División. He played 30 times in a season which ended in a return to the third tier, scoring his first goal for the team in a 3–2 win at RCD Mallorca the following 7 February.

After signing a new contract to last until 2018, Etxeberria returned to the second division on loan on 27 June 2016, being loaned to Real Valladolid for the upcoming season. After appearing rarely, he moved to fellow league team CD Numancia on 6 July 2017, also in a temporary deal.

On 19 June 2018, after featuring regularly as the Soria side narrowly missed out promotion in the play-offs, Etxeberria was released by Athletic as his contract was due to expire, and remained at Numancia for a further season. After failing to pin down a starting spot at Numancia he had several short term stints with limited playing times at Cartagena, Barakaldo and Eldense before signing for Sestao River in January, 2022.

References

External links

1995 births
Living people
People from Erandio
Sportspeople from Biscay
Footballers from the Basque Country (autonomous community)
Spanish footballers
Association football defenders
Segunda División players
Segunda División B players
Tercera División players
CD Basconia footballers
Bilbao Athletic footballers
Real Valladolid players
CD Numancia players
FC Cartagena footballers
Barakaldo CF footballers
CD Eldense footballers
Sestao River footballers
Athletic Bilbao footballers